Loewenberg may refer to:

Loewenberg, former name of Lwówek Śląski in Poland

People with the name

Deborah Loewenberg Ball, American mathematician
Jacob Loewenberg (1882-1969), Latvian-American philosopher
Peter Loewenberg (1933-), German professor of Politics

See also
Loewensberg
Loewer
Löwenberger Land, a municipality in the Oberhavel district, in the German state of Brandenburg